Vladimir Antonovich Alafuzov (17 June 1901, in Riga – 30 May 1966, in Leningrad) was a Soviet admiral and Order of Ushakov recipient, which he received on 8 November 1944. He joined the Russian Navy at the age of 17 and graduated from the Naval Academy by 1932.

References 

1901 births
1966 deaths
Military personnel from Riga
People from Kreis Riga
Communist Party of the Soviet Union members
Soviet admirals
Soviet military personnel of the Russian Civil War
Soviet people of the Spanish Civil War
Soviet military personnel of World War II
Recipients of the Order of Lenin
Recipients of the Order of the Red Banner
Recipients of the Order of Ushakov, 1st class
Burials at Serafimovskoe Cemetery